Pentadin, a sweet-tasting protein, was discovered and isolated in 1989, in the fruit of Oubli (Pentadiplandra brazzeana ), a climbing shrub growing in some tropical countries of Africa.

The fruit has been consumed by the apes and the natives for a long time. The berries of the plant were incredibly sweet African locals call them "j'oublie" (French for "I forget") because their taste helps nursing infants forget their mothers' milk.

Pentadin, with brazzein discovered in 1994, are the 2 sweet-tasting proteins discovered in this African fruit.

Pentadin molecular weight estimated to be 12kDa. It is reported to be 500 times sweeter than sucrose on a weight basis, with its sweetness having a slow onset and decline similar to monellin and thaumatin. However, pentadin's sweetness profile is closer to monellin than to thaumatin.

There are six sweet-tasting proteins - pentadin, thaumatin, monellin, mabinlin, brazzein, and curculin - that are all from isolated plants in tropical forests. They show no similarities in a structural or homologous sequence aspect.

Uses 
The six sweet-tasting proteins can be used as a natural low-calorie sweetener to replace certain sugars. They are also good for the response of insulin in people who are diabetic.

See also 
 Brazzein
 Mabinlin
 Monellin
 Thaumatin

References 

Sugar substitutes
Proteins